24 Boötis or g Boötis is a single, yellow-hued star in the constellation Boötes. It is faintly visible to the naked eye with an apparent visual magnitude of +5.59. Based upon an annual parallax shift of 10.00 mas, it is located around 326 light years from the Sun. The star is moving closer to the Sun with a radial velocity of −8 km/s. An extrasolar planet was discovered orbiting this star in 2018.

At the age of around 7 billion years old, it has 0.97 times the mass of the Sun but has expanded to 12 times the Sun's radius. The star is radiating 61.7 times the Sun's luminosity from its enlarged photosphere at an effective temperature of 4,863 K.

Planetary system
24 Boötis b was discovered by Takuya Takarada and collaborators using the Doppler Spectroscopy method, during the Okayama Planet Search radial velocity survey of G and K giants at Okayama Astrophysical Observatory. The preprint announcing the discovery was published on the arXiv eprint repository on April 11, 2018

References

External links
 HR 5420
 Image 24 Boötis

G-type giants
Boötes
Bootis, g
Durchmusterung objects
Bootis, 24
127243
070791
5420
Planetary systems with one confirmed planet